Thamar Nanette Henneken  (born 2 August 1979 in Delft, South Holland) is a former freestyle swimmer from the Netherlands, who was a member of the Dutch Women's 4×100 m freestyle relay team that won the silver medal at the 2000 Summer Olympics in Sydney, Australia. She did so alongside Inge de Bruijn, Wilma van Hofwegen and Manon van Rooijen.

After the Sydney Games she tried to succeed as a rower, but she soon returned to swimming. She is engaged to former world champion Marcel Wouda. The couple had a baby in early 2005.

References
Profile on Zwemkroniek
sports-reference

1979 births
Living people
Olympic swimmers of the Netherlands
Swimmers at the 2000 Summer Olympics
Olympic silver medalists for the Netherlands
Sportspeople from Delft
Dutch female freestyle swimmers
Medalists at the FINA World Swimming Championships (25 m)
Dutch female rowers
Medalists at the 2000 Summer Olympics
Olympic silver medalists in swimming